Debottam Majumdar is a Bengali television actor. He started his career in acting by performing in Bengali soap opera series Kokhono Megh Kokhono Brishti. He is well known for playing the male lead role of Shona babu as the protagonist in Keya Patar Nouko.

Career
Debottam forayed into Bengali television with  Kokhono Megh Kokhono Brishti telecasted on ETV Bangla. He became quite popular for his role as the protagonist in Keya Patar Nouko. Beside these, he is noted for playing father and son dual-role in Binni Dhaner Khoi also. Recently, he is seen playing contrasting roles in Khorkuto and Desher Maati. Apart from acting, he has been very vocal related to social issues of health, hygiene and cleanliness.

List of works

Television

References

External links 
 

Year of birth missing (living people)
Living people
Bengali male television actors
21st-century Indian actors